The Empress and I is a 1933 German musical comedy film directed by Friedrich Hollaender and starring Lilian Harvey, Mady Christians and Conrad Veidt. It is also known by the alternative title of The Only Girl. The film was produced as a multi-language version. Moi et l'impératrice a separate French-language version was released as well as The Only Girl in English. The multilingual Harvey played the same role in all three films.

It was shot at the Babelsberg Studios in Berlin. The film's sets were designed by the art directors Robert Herlth and Walter Röhrig. It was made by Erich Pommer's production unit at UFA, several of whom left the country after the film's release due to the Nazi Party's assumption of power.

Synopsis
After a fall from a horse, a wealthy Marquis is believed to be dying. While he lies there, he is comforted by the singing of a beautiful woman. When he unexpectedly recovers, he tries to seek out this young woman. Due to a series of confusions, he believes her to be Empress Eugenie, the wife of Napoleon III of France. In fact, the woman was a Eugenie's hairdresser, a vivacious young woman engaged to be married to an aspiring composer and conductor currently working for the celebrated Jacques Offenbach.

Cast
 Lilian Harvey as Juliette
 Mady Christians as Empress
 Conrad Veidt as Marquis de Pontignac
 Heinz Rühmann as Didier
 Friedel Schuster as Annabel
 Hubert von Meyerinck as Flügeladjutant
 Julius Falkenstein as Jacques Offenbach
 Paul Morgan as Erfinder des Fahrrades
 Hans Hermann Schaufuß as Doctor
 Kate Kühl as Marianne
 Heinrich Gretler as Sanitäter
 Eugen Rex as Etienne, Diener des Marquis
 Hans Deppe
 Hans Nowack as Erfinder des Telefons
 Margot Höpfner

References

Bibliography 
 Bock, Hans-Michael & Bergfelder, Tim. The Concise CineGraph. Encyclopedia of German Cinema. Berghahn Books, 2009.

External links 
 

1933 films
1933 musical comedy films
German musical comedy films
1930s historical comedy films
German historical comedy films
Films of the Weimar Republic
1930s German-language films
Films set in the 19th century
Films set in Paris
German multilingual films
UFA GmbH films
Films produced by Erich Pommer
German black-and-white films
Films shot at Babelsberg Studios
1933 multilingual films
1930s historical musical films
German historical musical films
1930s German films